Goldie Behl is an Indian filmmaker and entrepreneur belonging to the Behl family of Hindi films. He is married to Sonali Bendre.

Career
As student of Mayo College, Behl trained within the Mumbai Film Industry, born on January 24, 1975. In 2001, he made his directorial debut with the film Bas Itna Sa Khwab Hai (That’s All I Dream of) starring Abhishek Bachchan, Rani Mukherji, Sushmita Sen and Jackie Shroff. Behl then co-founded Rose-audiovisuals which has released shows such as Lipstick, Remix songs and Kabhi Haan Kabhi Na on Indian television network. Drona was his second film, with fantasy-action and special effects amalgamating Indian mythology with pure fantasy, and fusing a contemporary storyline.

Personal life

Goldie is related to many eminent people in the Hindi film industry through both his parents. His father is the director Ramesh Behl, whose brother is another noted film director, Shyam Behl. Shukla Devi Tuli, wife of superstar Rajendra Kumar Tuli, is a sister of Ramesh and Shyam Behl. Thus, the actor Kumar Gaurav is Goldie's first cousin; as are actor Ravi Behl and actress Geeta Behl, the children of Shyam Behl.

Goldie's mother is a daughter of actor Kamal Kapoor, who was a first cousin of Prithviraj Kapoor (they were the children of two sisters, both of whom were married to men named "Kapoor").

Goldie has a sister, Shrishti Arya, who is into software production and has co-produced many films with her brother. 

Goldie is happily married to former actress Sonali Bendre; they were married on 12 November 2002. Their son, Ranveer Behl, was born on 11 August 2005 at the Breach Candy Hospital in Mumbai.

Filmography

Director

Television producer

Web series

See also
 List of Hindi film families

References

External links

Hindi-language film directors
Living people
Film directors from Mumbai
Film producers from Mumbai
Hindi film producers
21st-century Indian film directors
1969 births